The Chengdu–Dazhou–Wanzhou high-speed railway or Chengdawan HSR is a high-speed railway currently under construction in China. This line forms part of the Shanghai–Chongqing–Chengdu high-speed railway.

History
This railway was planned as early as 2015. Construction began on 30 September 2022.

Route
The section between Tianfu and Tianfu Airport is shared with the Chengdu–Zigong high-speed railway.

Stations

References

High-speed railway lines in China
High-speed railway lines under construction

25 kV AC railway electrification